The 2004 World University Sailing Championship took place in Izmir, Turkey between July 4 and 8 2004. 25 men and 14 women from 7 countries participated at the third edition tournament.

Participating nations

Results
For this event, the FISU protocol was somewhat modified, so that the athletes were not given medals but rather they were awarded cups in the tradition of sailing competitions.

Medal count table

See also
 World University Championships

References

World University
World University
Sail
Collegiate sailing competitions
Sailing
Sailing in Turkey
Sports competitions in Izmir
July 2004 sports events in Turkey
2000s in İzmir